Communauté d'agglomération du Libournais is the communauté d'agglomération, an intercommunal structure, centred on the town of Libourne. It is located in the Gironde department, in the Nouvelle-Aquitaine region, southwestern France. Created in 2017, its seat is in Libourne. Its area is 568.8 km2. Its population was 91,475 in 2019, of which 24,257 in Libourne proper.

Composition
The communauté d'agglomération consists of the following 45 communes:

Abzac
Arveyres
Bayas
Les Billaux
Bonzac
Cadarsac
Camps-sur-l'Isle
Chamadelle
Coutras
Daignac
Dardenac
Les Églisottes-et-Chalaures
Espiet
Le Fieu
Génissac
Gours
Guîtres
Izon
Lagorce
Lalande-de-Pomerol
Lapouyade
Libourne
Maransin
Moulon
Nérigean
Les Peintures
Pomerol
Porchères
Puynormand
Sablons
Saint-Antoine-sur-l'Isle
Saint-Christophe-de-Double
Saint-Ciers-d'Abzac
Saint-Denis-de-Pile
Saint-Germain-du-Puch
Saint-Martin-de-Laye
Saint-Martin-du-Bois
Saint-Médard-de-Guizières
Saint-Quentin-de-Baron
Saint-Sauveur-de-Puynormand
Saint-Seurin-sur-l'Isle
Savignac-de-l'Isle
Tizac-de-Curton
Tizac-de-Lapouyade
Vayres

References

Libournais
Libournais